Romance in Rio is a studio album by singer/songwriter Stephen Bishop. It was recorded with eminent Brazilian guitarist Oscar Castro-Neves. It combines six new songs with six of Bishop's best-known tunes, all in a tropical mood. Special guests Eric Clapton and Earl Klugh contribute guitar solos on two tracks.

This album was previously released as Saudade in 2007. It was only available at Target.

Track listing
All songs written by Stephen Bishop, except where noted.

Personnel 
 Stephen Bishop – vocals
 Dave Grusin – keyboards, acoustic piano
 Oscar Castro-Neves – keyboards, guitars, sampling, guitar solo (1, 3)
 Earl Klugh – guitar solo (4)
 Eric Clapton – steel guitar solo (5)
 Brian Bromberg – bass 
 Alex Acuña – drums
 Kevin Ricard – percussion
 Gary Meek – saxophones, woodwinds
 Luciana Souza – vocals (4)
 Charlotte Gibson – backing vocals (5, 6)
 Kenny Rankin – backing vocals (7)

Production 
 Oscar Castro-Neves – producer, arrangements, engineer, mixing
 Peter Bunetta – co-producer 
 Jim Brandmeier – executive producer 
 J.J Blair – engineer 
 Max Coane – engineer 
 Carlos Del Rosario – engineer, mixing 
 Geoff Gillette – engineer, mixing 
 Marco Martin – engineer 
 Tom McCauley – engineer 
 Charlie Paakkari – engineer 
 Jason Rosenberg – engineer 
 Milton Gutierrez – assistant engineer 
 Dan Johnson – assistant engineer 
 Bernie Grundman – mastering 
 Chris Deschaine – graphic design
 David Alan Kogut – graphic design
 Robert Ferrone – cover photography 
 Lorraine Castro-Neves – photography 
 Belle DeNardo – photography 
 Charles Villers – photography

References

2008 albums
Stephen Bishop (singer) albums